Events from the year 1720 in France.

Incumbents 
Monarch: Louis XV
Regent: Philip II of Orleans

Events
 February 17 – Treaty of The Hague signed between Spain, Britain, France, Austria and the Dutch Republic, ending the War of the Quadruple Alliance.
 Outbreak of plague in Marseille; the bishop, Henri François Xavier de Belsunce de Castelmoron, wins approbation by remaining in his diocese.
 John Law abandons all his accumulated wealth and flees to Brussels amidst the collapse of the Mississippi Bubble.

Births

 

 March 22 – Nicolas-Henri Jardin, French architect (d. 1799)
 November 1 – Toussaint-Guillaume Picquet de la Motte, French admiral (d. 1791)
 November 16 – Carlo Antonio Campioni, French-born composer (d. 1788)

Deaths

 April 21 – Antoine Hamilton, French writer (b. 1646)
 June 27 – Guillaume Amfrye de Chaulieu, French poet (b. 1639)
 August 17 – Anne Lefèvre, French scholar (b. 1654)
 September 3 – Henri de Massue, Marquis de Ruvigny, 1st Viscount Galway, French soldier and diplomat (b. 1648)
 October 10 – Antoine Coysevox, French sculptor (b. 1640)

See also

References

1720s in France